IBM Lotus QuickPlace is a proprietary Web-based collaborative software application distributed by the Lotus Software division of IBM. Lotus QuickPlace is a self-service Web tool that provides non-technical professionals the ability to easily create a browser-accessible workspace to support a task, project, or initiative. QuickPlace also integrates with IBM Lotus Sametime providing  presence awareness of other users online and available for conferencing.

The look and feel of QuickPlace is similar to a one-page-at-a-time portal experience (rather than multiple applications or portlets on one page), with the ease of adding material in the way of a wiki.

The name was changed to IBM Lotus Team Workplace in release 6.5.1. However, the name caused confusion in the marketplace with another IBM product with similar functionality, IBM Workplace Team Collaboration. Therefore, the QuickPlace name was brought back in release 7.0, which was the last version. QuickPlace has been superseded by IBM Lotus Quickr.

See also
List of collaborative software

References

External links
IBM Lotus QuickPlace website
IBM Lotus Software website

QuickPlace
Lotus QuickPlace